Afroarabiella tahamae is a moth in the family Cossidae. It is found in Saudi Arabia and Yemen.

References

Natural History Museum Lepidoptera generic names catalog

Cossinae
Moths described in 1949
Moths of the Middle East